This is a list of councillors and aldermen elected or co-opted to the London County Council from 1949 until its abolition in 1965.

The method of electing the council, and the electoral boundaries were altered by the Representation of the People Act 1948. The County of London was divided into electoral districts which were identical to the constituencies used to elected members of parliament (MPs) to the House of Commons. Until 1949 each electoral district returned two county councillors. The exception was the City of London, which had four county councillors and elected two MPs.

Under the 1948 legislation the number of constituencies in the county was reduced from sixty-one to forty-three due to population loss. Each electoral district, corresponding to the new constituencies, was to have three councillors. The number of elected councillors was thus 129. To this were added 21 aldermen who were chosen by the council. Aldermen had a six-year term of office, with half being chosen every three years at the first meeting following the election of councillors.

Elections on these boundaries were held in 1949 and 1952. Further boundary changes were made by the First Periodic Review of Westminster constituencies, coming into effect in 1955. This led to a net loss of one seat in the County of London, and a reduction in the number of councillors to 126, with the number of aldermen remaining at 21. Elections were held on the revised boundaries in 1955, 1958 and 1961.

Under the London Government Act 1963 the London County Council was to be abolished on 31 March 1965, and replaced by the Greater London Council (GLC), covering a larger area. The 1963 legislation cancelled the county council elections due in 1964, extending the term of office of councillors and aldermen until the abolition date. The elections to the first GLC were held in 1964, with the new council acting as a "shadow" authority until 1 April 1965. A number of county council members subsequently served on the GLC.

Councillors 1949 – 1955

Councillors 1955 – 1965
* Elected to the successor Greater London Council 1964
† Appointed an alderman on the successor Greater London Council 1964

County aldermen 1949–1965

Aldermen retiring in 1946 had originally been elected for 1934–1940, those retiring in 1949 had been elected for 1937–1943.

See also
List of members of London County Council 1889–1919
List of members of London County Council 1919–1937
List of members of London County Council 1937–1949
List of chairmen of the London County Council

References

 
London County Council